Connel Bridge is a cantilever bridge that spans Loch Etive at Connel in Scotland. The bridge takes the A828 road across the narrowest part of the loch, at the Falls of Lora. It is a category B listed structure.

History 

The bridge was built by Arrol's Bridge and Roof Company to carry the Ballachulish branch line of the Callander and Oban Railway, which opened on 20 August 1903. Nearly  of steel were used in its construction and it cost almost £43,000 to build. When complete it had a longer span than any other railway bridge in Britain except the Forth Bridge,  built by a different firm. The Connel Bridge was constructed by a firm called Arrol, of the Germiston Iron Works, Glasgow It was engineered by John Wolfe Barry and others.

Originally, the bridge carried just the railway (a single track). A single car was carried on a wagon hauled by a charabanc that had been adapted to run on rails at St. Rollox railway works in Glasgow. This service also called at North Connel station at the north end of the bridge.

In 1914, a roadway was added to the bridge, alongside the railway line. The road occupied the western side of the bridge, with the railway running parallel immediately to the east. Due to the close proximity of road and railway, road traffic and trains were not permitted on the bridge at the same time and the bridge was effectively operated as an extended level crossing with gates. The road crossed to the opposite side of the railway at the north end of the bridge. A toll was payable by road users.

After the branch line closed in 1966, the bridge was converted for the exclusive use of road vehicles and pedestrians, and the toll was removed. Despite the railway track having been removed, the roadway is not wide enough for two vehicles to cross each other. Traffic lights are installed at each end of the bridge to enforce one-way traffic.

Design
The large span without supporting piers was necessitated by the strong tidal currents of the Falls of Lora, just to the east of the bridge.

The approach viaducts on each side of the bridge both comprise three masonry arches.

Filming 
Connel Bridge appears in the 1981 film Eye of the Needle, starring Donald Sutherland. In the film, Sutherland's character is seen riding a stolen motorcycle across the bridge, which he then disposes of by pushing it down the embankment at the north end of the bridge after it runs out of fuel.

References

External links

Video of cars and trains sharing the bridge circa 1962 at the National Library of Scotland

Cantilever bridges
Railway bridges in Scotland
Bridges completed in 1903
Category B listed buildings in Argyll and Bute
Listed bridges in Scotland
Road bridges in Scotland
Former toll bridges in Scotland
Bridges in Argyll and Bute
1903 establishments in Scotland